Many Facez is the debut studio album by American rapper Tracey Lee. It was released on March 25, 1997 via Universal Records. Production was handled by Deric "D-Dot" Angelettie, DJ Parlay, Ron "Amen-Ra" Lawrence, William "Pirate" Darden, Cedric Thornton, Ike Lee III, Michael Jeter, Nashiem Myrick, and Lee himself. It features guest appearances from Busta Rhymes, Erika Kaine, Notorious B.I.G., One Step Beyond, and The Reepz. The album peaked at number 111 on the Billboard 200, while its lead single "The Theme (It's Party Time)" reached number 55 on the Billboard Hot 100 in the United States.

Track listing

Charts

References

External links

1997 debut albums
Albums produced by D-Dot
Universal Records albums